Statistics of Division 2 in the 1947–48 season.

Overview
It was contested by 20 teams, and Nice won the championship.

Teams
A total of twenty teams contested the league, including sixteen sides from the 1946–47 season and four sides relegated from the 1946–47 French Division 1. The league was contested in a double round robin format, with each club playing every other club twice, for a total of 38 rounds. Two points were awarded for wins and one point for draws.

League table

References
France - List of final tables (RSSSF)

French
2
Ligue 2 seasons